Tecoma is a genus of 14 species of shrubs or small trees in the trumpet vine family, Bignoniaceae. Twelve species are from the Americas, while the other two species are African. The American species range from the extreme southern United States through Central America and the Antilles south through Andean South America to northern Argentina. The generic name is derived from the Nahuatl word tecomaxochitl, which was applied by the indigenous peoples of Mexico to plants with tubular flowers. Trumpetbush is a common name for plants in this genus.

Species

Hybrids and cultivars 
 Tecoma × smithii W. Watson

Formerly placed here

References

 
Bignoniaceae genera